Dalianwan may refer to:

 Dalian Bay, Liaoning Province, China
 Dalianwan Station, Dalian Metro